Hermann Lause (7 February 1939 - 28 March 2005) was a German film actor. He appeared in more than seventy films from 1966 to 2005. He died of cancer.

Selected filmography

References

External links
 

1939 births
2005 deaths
People from Meppen
German male film actors
German male television actors
20th-century German male actors
21st-century German male actors